Nankang–Dynatek was a UCI Continental cycling team founded in 2013 that disbanded after the 2015 season. It was originally sponsored by Ceramica Flaminia, an Italian tile manufacturer which previously sponsored the Ceramica Flaminia team between 2005 and 2010, and was based in Lucca, Tuscany, Italy. It was later sponsored by Nankang, a tire company, and was based in Serbia.

Team roster

Major wins
2013
Stage 3 Okolo Slovenska, Andrea Fedi
Giro dell'Appennino, Davide Mucelli
2015
 National Road Race Championships, Ivan Stević
 National Time Trial Championships, Gabor Kasa
Stage 5 Tour of Bulgaria, Ivan Stević
Stage 1 International Tour of Torku Mevlana, Ivan Stević

References

External links

UCI Continental Teams (Europe)
Cycling teams based in Italy
Cycling teams established in 2013
Cycling teams based in Serbia